"History Never Repeats" is a single written by Neil Finn and recorded by Split Enz. It was released in March 1981 as the second single from their seventh studio album, Waiata. The song remains one of their most popular. It was also used as the title of two compilation albums by the band.

The guitar bridge in this song, played by Neil Finn, was originally featured in an old Phil Judd song, "Bergen Aan Zee". The band only played the latter song live.

The video was the 12th to be played by MTV upon its launch in 1981. In 2001 the song was voted by members of APRA as the 57th best New Zealand song of the 20th century.

Track listings

Australasian release 
"History Never Repeats" - 3:00
"Holy Smoke"

International release 
Released in the UK, the Netherlands, Spain, and Portugal with different artwork and track listings.

UK/Portugal Track Listing
"History Never Repeats" - 3:00
"Shark Attack (Live)"
"What's The Matter With You (Live)"

Netherlands/Spain Track Listing
"History Never Repeats" - 3:00
"What's the Matter with You (Live)"

Personnel 
 Neil Finn - vocals, guitar
 Tim Finn - vocals
 Noel Crombie - percussion
 Malcolm Green - drums
 Nigel Griggs - bass
 Eddie Rayner - vocals, keyboards

Charts

Weekly charts

Year-end charts

References

APRA Award winners
Split Enz songs
1981 singles
Songs written by Neil Finn
1980 songs
Mushroom Records singles